The twenty-first government of Israel was formed by Shimon Peres of the Alignment on 13 September 1984, following the July elections. With both the Alignment and Likud winning over 40 seats each, neither side could form a stand-alone coalition, resulting in a national unity government, together with the National Religious Party, Agudat Yisrael, Shas, Morasha, Shinui and Ometz, which together held 97 of the 120 seats in the Knesset. However, in protest at the alliance with Likud, Mapam broke away from the Alignment, as did Yossi Sarid, who joined Ratz.

The government was replaced by the twenty-second government on 20 October 1986, when Yitzhak Shamir replaced Peres as Prime Minister in accordance with the rotation agreement between the Alignment and Likud. The rotation agreement also led to the creation of the post of Acting Prime Minister, who would take over the powers of Prime Minister if they were incapable of fulfilling their duties, as opposed to the Deputy Prime Minister, which was a symbolic role. The Minister of Police was also restored to the cabinet.

Cabinet members

1 The post was initially called the Minister of Economics and Inter-Ministry Coordination, before being renamed on 16 September 1984.

References

External links
Ninth Knesset: Government 21 Knesset website

 21
1984 establishments in Israel
1986 disestablishments in Israel
Cabinets established in 1984
Cabinets disestablished in 1986
1984 in Israeli politics
1985 in Israeli politics
1986 in Israeli politics
 21
Grand coalition governments
Rotation governments